Archaeopress is an academic publisher specialising in archaeology, based in Oxford. The company publishes multiple series of books and academic journals, including Archaeopress Archaeology and Proceedings of the Seminar for Arabian Studies (PSAS).

History 

In the early 1990s, David Davison and Rajka Makjanic worked at Tempvs Reparatvm, involved with publishing archaeological titles. Archaeopress was founded in 1997, with Davison leading the editing process whilst Makjanic managed production of the books.

Archaeopress, with John and Erica Hedges, succeeded Tempvs Reparatvm as the publisher of the British Archaeological Reports series, though in 2015 began concentrating their own range of imprints.

References

External links
 
 
 

Book publishing companies of England
Companies based in Oxford
Archaeological organizations